The 2014 Asian Netball Championships was the 9th edition of the Asian Netball Championships. The competition took place between September 7-14 with the tournament being held in Singapore. Ten teams competed in the tournament with Singapore winning the championship over Sri Lanka

Final draw
The final draw used the world rankings to sort the teams in a serpentine format.

Group A

Group B

Play-off matches

9th place play-off

7th place play-off

5th place play-off

Knockout round

References

2014
2014 in netball
Asia2014
2014 in Singaporean women's sport
September 2014 sports events in Asia